Lubabalo Vincent Gwavu (born 4 September 1987) is a South African rugby union player, currently playing with club side QBR. His regular position is flanker.

Career

Youth

Senior career

Blue Bulls
Gwavu was included in the  squads for both the 2006 and 2007 Vodacom Cup competitions, but failed to make an appearance. He made further appearances for the Blue Bulls in the 2009, 2010 and 2011 Vodacom Cup competitions, but failed to break into their Currie Cup side.

SWD Eagles

Falcons

Representative rugby
He was included in the 2005 S.A. Schools team and the 2006 South African Under-19 team that took part at the IRB Under 19 World Championship. In 2013, he was initially included in a South Africa President's XV training squad to play in the 2013 IRB Tbilisi Cup and made one appearance for them against , but didn't make the cut for the final squad.

Varsity Cup

References

1987 births
Living people
Rugby union players from Port Elizabeth
Xhosa people
South African rugby union players
Blue Bulls players
Falcons (rugby union) players
SWD Eagles players
Tshwane University of Technology alumni
Rugby union flankers